Eric Moore (16 July 1926 – 5 August 2004) was an English footballer, who played as a full back in the Football League for Everton, Chesterfield and Tranmere Rovers.

References

1926 births
2004 deaths
Association football fullbacks
Chesterfield F.C. players
English Football League players
English footballers
Everton F.C. players
Footballers from St Helens, Merseyside
Tranmere Rovers F.C. players